Liverpool Buccaneers Rugby League Football Club are an amateur rugby league club from West Derby in Liverpool. The team plays home games at Sefton RUFC in West Derby. Currently they play in the North West Premier division of the Rugby League Conference and the North West Merit League.

History
The team was formed in the winter of 2002. They joined the North West Division of the Rugby League Conference in 2003.

In the 2006 season they won both the Cheshire Division and subsequently went on to win the RLC Regional Grand Final however in the 2007 season they ended up top of the North West Division but narrowly lost to Widnes Saints in the Regional Grand Final.

Liverpool joined the Rugby League Conference National Division in 2008 and made the play-offs.

Liverpool Buccaneers withdrew from the National Division in 2010.

Club honours
 RLC Regional Champions (National): 2006
 RLC Cheshire Division Champions: 2006
 RLC National play-offs: 2008

Hall of fame
 2008- Mark Webster
 2009- Chris Chamberlain
 2009- Keiran Lacey
 2009- Tony Woods
 2009- Chris Lee
 2009- Mike Woods

Coaching staff
 2002- 2003 Mike Rush(Head Coach)
 2003- 2005 Lee Addison (Head Coach)
 2005- 2005 Mark Yates (Head Coach)
 2006–Present Chris Chamberlain (Player / Head Coach)

External links
 Official website

Rugby League Conference teams
Sports organisations based in Liverpool
Rugby clubs established in 2002
Rugby league teams in Merseyside
2002 establishments in England